Dear Chickens is a short dramedy. The film's run time is 14 minutes. It was co-written and directed by Mauro Mueller, and produced by Björn Hering, Mauro Mueller, Tim Birkhofer and David Figueroa García, and co-produced by Rocio Lopez. The film was shot by Mexican cinematographer Andrea González Mereles.

The short film qualified to the Academy Awards for Best Live Action Short Film in 2019.
The short film screened at various festivals including LA Shorts Fest in 2018 and winning best actor for Philip Baker Hall, Zurich Film Festival as part of a series of films about cancer, FILMETS Badalona Film Festival winning also best actor for Philip Baker Hall Mexico Shortsfest 2019, HollyShorts Film Festival and Pendance Flm Festival in Toronto.

Plot
When a stubborn old man (Philip Baker Hall) and a fretful teenaged girl (Kerris Dorsey) are forced to share a hospital room, an unexpected friendship forms over their hatred of fake cheerfulness and bad hospital food. The film is a comedy-drama.

Awards
The film won best actor at LA Shorts Fest and Filmets Badalona Film Festival in Barcelona for Philip Baker Hall.

Cast
Philip Baker Hall as Emil
Kerris Dorsey as Nora
James Eckhouse as Dr. Friedman
Linda Park as Nurse Stephanie

Release
On 27 July 2018, the film had its world premiere at LA Shorts Fest in Los Angeles. The film had its European premiere at the Solothurn Film Festival in the short film competition section and in Mexico at Shortsfest in September 2018.

References

External links
 
 official film website

2018 films
2018 short films
Mexican short films
2010s English-language films